Scimitarbills (also spelt scimitar-bills) are three species of African bird belonging to the genus Rhinopomastus. They are often classified in the woodhoopoe family, Phoeniculidae; however, genetic studies show that they diverged from the true woodhoopoes about 10 million years ago and so they are sometimes placed in a family of their own, the Rhinopomastidae.

They are smaller than most woodhoopoes and their bills are strongly curved like a scimitar, giving them their name. They are mostly glossy black in colour with a few white markings on the wings. While other woodhoopoes are gregarious birds which gather in flocks, the scimitarbills are usually seen alone or in pairs.

They feed mainly on insects and other invertebrates, which they find by using their bills to probe into holes and crevices. They are acrobatic birds, well-adapted for clambering through trees. The eggs are laid in a tree cavity.

Species

References
 Christopher Perrins, ed. (2004) The New Encyclopedia of Birds, Oxford University Press, Oxford
 Ian Sinclair & Peter Ryan (2003) Birds of Africa south of the Sahara, Struik, Cape Town

Phoeniculidae